Angkor Chey District is a district located in Kampot Province, in southern Cambodia.

References 

Districts of Kampot province